O-Kay for Sound is a 1937 British comedy film directed by Marcel Varnel and starring the Crazy Gang troupe of comedians. After falling on hard times the members of the Crazy Gang are busking on the streets of London. However, they are hired as extras on a film set. After arriving at the studios they are mistaken for a group of potential investors and given free run of the studios, causing chaos.

The film was based on a stage work by Bert Lee and R. P. Weston. It was made at Islington Studios by Gainsborough Pictures, with sets designed by the art director Alex Vetchinsky.

Main cast
 Jimmy Nervo as Cecil
 Teddy Knox as Teddy
 Bud Flanagan as Bud
 Chesney Allen as Ches
 Charlie Naughton as Charlie
 Jimmy Gold as Jimmy
 Fred Duprez as Hyman Goldberger
 Enid Stamp-Taylor as Jill Smith, secretary
 Meinhart Maur as Guggenheimer
 Graham Moffatt as Albert, the page boy
 Patricia Bowman as Dancer
 Peter Dawson as Singer
 Jan Gotch as All-In Wrestler
 H. F. Maltby as John Rigby
 Louis Pergantes as All-In Wrestler
 The Sherman Fisher Girls as Dancers
 Louis Levy as Conductor

References

Bibliography
 Mundy, John. The British musical film. Manchester University Press, 2007.

External links

1937 films
1937 comedy films
British comedy films
Films directed by Marcel Varnel
Gainsborough Pictures films
Islington Studios films
Films set in London
British films based on plays
Films about filmmaking
British black-and-white films
1930s English-language films
1930s British films
English-language comedy films